The Elephant King is a 2017 Iranian animated feature film by Honar Pooya Studio. This is the second animated feature film of Honar Pooya after Princess of Rome. Hadi Muhammadian directed the film and Hamed Jafari was the producer.

Story  
The story revolves around the society of elephants in a jungle in Africa.  Shadphil (the elephant king’s son) is supposed to rule the society after his father.

Production 
A group of Iranian voice artists took part in this work. Bahram Zand, Naser Tahmasb, Mirtaher Mazloomi, Shokat Hojjat, Zohre Shokoofande, Hamed Azizi, George Petrosi, Bahman Hashemi, Akbar Manafi and Shayan Shambiati supervised by Saeed Sheikhzade dubbed this animation.

Release 
The Elephant King was the only animation participated in Fajr International Film Festival held in Tehran in February 2018.

References

External links
 

Iranian animated films
2017 animated films
2017 films
Lebanese animated films
Animated films about elephants
2010s Arabic-language films
2010s Persian-language films
Lebanese multilingual films
Iranian multilingual films
2017 multilingual films